Bruce Driscoll (born June 13, 1983) is an American record producer, songwriter, guitarist, film composer, and vocalist. He first gained notability as one half of the pop band Blondfire; co-writing, producing and self-releasing songs with his sister, Erica.

In 2011, he formed the band Freedom Fry with his wife, the Parisian singer/songwriter and producer Marie Seyrat.

Biography

Early life and career
Driscoll was born in Grand Rapids, Michigan. He started playing piano and drums at an early age then picked up the guitar when he was 15, inspired by the sound of guitarists Johnny Marr and George Harrison. Taking quickly to the instrument, he began accompanying his two sisters, Monica and Erica, in a band called Nectar. In order to free himself to tour with the group he withdrew from traditional high school and completed an independent study program through the University of Missouri.

The siblings embarked on a national tour and eventually landed a development deal with EMI Publishing when Bruce Driscoll was aged 17. Soon after they showcased for many of the US major record labels, including Warner Bros. Records, Maverick, and Capitol. In 2002, they won Runner Up in the Pop Category for the UK Songwriting Contest with the song, "Life Out Loud". Later that year the siblings disbanded over creative differences.

Personal life
In 2011 Driscoll relocated to Los Angeles, California, from New York. In 2013 he and Freedom Fry bandmate, Marie Seyrat, were married.

Astaire

In 2003 Bruce and Erica Driscoll began recording songs in their parents' basement which would turn out to be early Astaire demos. The songs took a stylistically more left of center pop sound. The demos were sent to Andy Chase of Ivy who loved the songs and wanted to produce the duo at his studio, Stratosphere Sound, in New York. After working with Chase in the studio the siblings relocated to New York and released their first EP, Don't Whisper Lies, on their own label.

The band toured with Ivy, Stars, and Robbers On High Street in 2005. In the middle of the tour lawyers for the Fred Astaire Estate threatened to sue if the duo did not change their name. Lacking the money to afford legal fees they changed their name to Blondfire.

Throughout his career Driscoll has continued to collaborate with Andy Chase. First playing keyboards in Ivy, guitar in Chase's band Brookville, and then co-writing and producing tracks for his band, Camera2.

Blondfire
The duo continued on as Blondfire signing a contract with EMI UK in October 2006. Shortly thereafter EMI was bought out by Terra Firma and went through internal changes.  The duo left the label in mid-2007 and self-released their debut album, My Someday, in April 2008.

In September 2012, following the viral internet and radio success of their song, "Where The Kids Are", Blondfire signed to Warner Bros. Records and Primary Wave Publishing and began mixing of their album, Young Heart, with mixer Wally Gagel.

Sleepy Rebels
Sleepy Rebels was formed after several of the songs Driscoll had written with television and advertisement composer Jeremy Adelman were used in commercials. Erica also joined the group and collaborated with them over the course of three albums, World Record, Yellow Tree and the Christmas themed album, Bah Humbug. Sleepy Rebel's music has been used in ads for J. C. Penney, VW, Tide and others.

Freedom Fry
In April 2011, Driscoll met Parisian born Marie Seyrat during pre-production on Blondfire's "Where The Kids Are" video. Seyrat, the stylist on the video, played him a cover of her singing a song in French over a ukulele. Entranced by her whispery voice, Driscoll asked her if she would be interested in writing some songs together. The following August they formed the duo Freedom Fry and released the Let The Games Begin EP.

Their song "Rolling Down" was featured in the premiere episode of Bones, during the birth of baby Christine. Their single, "Earthquake", was named as single-of-the-week by the French magazine, Les Inrockuptibles.

Discography
 2004 - Astaire - Don't Whisper Lies EP - Producer, Drums, Bass, Keyboards, Programming, Guitar, Vocals, Group Member
 2005 - Various Artists - Auralgasms:  Bliss Of Life - Producer, Performer
 2005 - Blondfire - Live Session (iTunes Exclusive) EP - Guitar, Producer
 2005 - Blondfire - Holiday EP - Producer, Guitar, Piano, Bass
 2005 - Monster In Law (Original Soundtrack) - Producer, Guitar
 2006 - Brookville - Life In The Shade - Synthesizer, Bass, Guitar, Theremin, Vocals, Producer, Engineer, Drum Programming
 2006 - Mônica da Silva - "Miles From Nowhere" - Guitar (Rhythm), Keyboards
 2006 - The Postmarks - Remixes - Remixer
 2007 - The Voyces - Kissing Like It's Love - Engineer
 2008 - Blondfire - My Someday - Producer, Mixing, Guitar, Keyboards, Vocals
 2008 - Sleepy Rebels - World Record - Producer, Composer, Instrumentation, Vocals, Mixer, Group Member
 2010 - Lana Mír - Lana Mír - Producer, Composer, Instrumentation, Mixer
 2010 - Tamar Kaprelian - Sinner Or A Saint (Interscope) - Producer (New Day (Acoustic)), Engineer, Guitar
 2010 - Mônica da Silva - Brasilissima - Producer, Guitar, Keyboards, Programming
 2012 - Sleepy Rebels - Bah Humbug! - Producer, Composer, Instrumentation, Vocals, Mixer, Group Member
 2011 - Sleepy Rebels - Yellow Tree - Producer, Composer, Instrumentation, Vocals, Mixer, Group Member
 2011 - Ivy - All Hours (Nettwerk) - Programming
 2011 - Elan - We Are - Producer ("My Baby And Me"), Composer
 2011 - Freedom Fry - Let The Games Begin EP - Producer, Mixing, Group Member
 2001 - Blondfire - "Where The Kids Are" (Single) - Producer, Engineer, Vocals, Guitar, Drums, Keyboards, Group Member
 2012 - Freedom Fry - "Earthquake" (Single) - Producer, Mixing, Group Member
 2012 - Blondfire - "Walking With Giants" (Single) - Producer, Vocals, Guitar, Drums, Keyboards, Group Member
 2012 - Freedom Fry - Outlaws EP - Producer, Mixing, Group Member
 2012 - Freedom Fry - "Summer in the City" (Single) - Producer, Mixing, Group Member
 2012 - Blondfire - Where The Kids Are EP (Warner Bros) - Producer, Engineer, Guitar, Drums, Vocals, Bass, Keyboards, Group Member
 2012 - Freedom Fry - "Dark Christmas" (Single) - Producer, Engineer, Vocals, Guitar, Drums, Keyboards, Group Member
 2012 - Camera2 - "Just About Made It" (Single) - Producer, Engineer, Vocals, Guitar, Bass, Drum Programming
 2013 - Avicii - True - Composer
 2014 - Blondfire - Young Heart - Producer, Engineer, Guitar, Drums, Vocals, Bass, Keyboards, Group Member
 2014 - Freedom Fry - "Home" (Single) - Producer, Engineer, Vocals, Guitar, Drums, Keyboards, Group Member
 2014 - Freedom Fry - The Wilder Mile EP -  Producer, Engineer, Vocals, Guitar, Drums, Keyboards, Group Member

Filmography
 2011 - Girder (Short) - Director: Thomas Leveritt - Film Composer
 2012 - Starting From Scratch - Director: James Huang - Film Composer (Credited as Freedom Fry)
 2012 - Minte-Ma Frumos - Director: Iura Luncasu - Film Composer

References

External links
 Official Bruce Driscoll website
 MSNBC's "Independent Study" profile

1983 births
Living people
Record producers from Michigan
American audio engineers
American people of Brazilian descent
Musicians from Grand Rapids, Michigan
Guitarists from Michigan
American male guitarists
Engineers from Michigan
21st-century American guitarists
21st-century American male musicians